4. documenta was the fourth edition of documenta, a quinquennial contemporary art exhibition. It was held between 27 June and 6 October 1968 in Kassel, West Germany. The artistic director was 24-strong documenta council and Arnold Bode.

Participants

References 

Documenta 4
1968 in West Germany
1968 in art